Aspidnoye, also referred to as Dresba and Krumaya, is an abandoned Russian military airfield near Ambarchik in Bilibinsky District, Chukotka Autonomous Okrug, on the border with the Sakha Republic, located 41 km north of Petushki and near the now also abandoned settlement of Mikhalkino.

History
The airfield was constructed around 1960 and was initially classified by the CIA as a long range bomber base, though it was never completed.  US KH-4 reconnaissance satellite passes in 1963 showed no aircraft activity at the base but indicated an exceptionally long 15,000 ft (4600 m) runway.  However this runway was made of graded earth and analysts determined the airfield was probably not usable during the summertime due to mud and drainage across the surfaces.  The airfield was likely intended as a winter season arctic staging base, as the open tundra and packed snow would allow for large numbers of bomber aircraft to be serviced with minimal infrastructure.  The base would then be abandoned each spring.

The airfield was intended for staging and dispersal for the Soviet Union's Tupolev Tu-95 and Tupolev Tu-22 bomber force.  The position of Aspidnoye on the shore of the Arctic Ocean would have given it access to northern resupply ship routes for fuel supplies.  A defense radar facility, probably a P-14 Tall King unit, exists on satellite imagery 14 km northwest of the airfield.

The last reference in declassified CIA documents to Aspidnoye was in 1973 when it appeared in a target list.  It was listed as non-operational and covered by snow.

See also
Other abandoned arctic staging bases:
 Chekurovka
 Ostrov Bolshevik
 Tiksi North
 Tiksi West

References

Soviet Long Range Aviation Arctic staging bases
Former populated places in Russia
Airports in Chukotka Autonomous Okrug